is a point-and-click adventure game by Japanese artist Osamu Sato. It was published by Sony Music Entertainment Japan for Classic Mac OS in Japan in 1994, and in North America the following year by Sony Imagesoft. The game is considered to be a cult classic, with critics praising its surrealism.

Plot and gameplay 

Eastern Mind is a point-and-click adventure game about a man named Rin who has lost his soul. A friend gives him an artificial soul that will last 49 days, with which he goes on a quest to a location known as Tong Nou, to die and be reincarnated nine times, in order to recover his soul. Transmigration is a core game mechanic, requiring the player to die and be reborn as part of the experience, before he can finally ascend to the center of the island.

Development
In 1993, game director, producer, artist, composer, and co-writer Osamu Sato became Sony Music Japan's Digital Entertainment Program's Grand Prix winner. This, plus other awards on his résumé, allowed him to create Eastern Mind as a four-person team which included himself and his wife. This gave him the leverage he needed to get Sony to publish the game. Sato began development on Chu-Teng after the publication of Eastern Mind. The games were originally designed to be part of a trilogy, but this idea was abandoned during development. He would follow these projects with another game, LSD: Dream Emulator, in 1998.

Sato described Eastern Mind as an interactive CD-ROM experience rather than a video game, as he felt this classification would give him more legitimacy in the American market. Incorporating elements of his own Buddhist belief system, the game explores transmigration; dying is not seen as a typical game over state, ending the narrative. It is instead followed by the player revived as a different character, a process necessary to advance through the story. The game was created using Macromedia Director.

Sato felt it was important that he appear in his game; the green island of Tong Nou is an altered version of the head of the game's designer. At the time of development, Sato was a techno-house musician; he therefore used this genre for the game's soundtrack. There is no voice acting, and instead the words appear at the bottom of the screen as subtitles. The narrative was co-written by Hiroko Nishikawa, who worked as a screenwriter on many of Sato's works. Hardcore Gaming 101 surmised that Sato designed the sequel to be more traditional out of fear that the first game's weirdness may have scared people away, noting that in retrospect this became Eastern Minds draw card. Five of the game's musical tracks would be featured on Sato's 1995 album Transmigration. Reworked versions of the game's themes would be released on another album of Sato's in 2017, All Things Must Be Equal.

Release  
Eastern Mind was first released in Japan by Sony Music Entertainment Japan in April 1994, and was later localized in English and released by Sony Imagesoft for Microsoft Windows as well as Mac OS in early August 1995. The game was also planned to be released for the PlayStation, but fell through. The game became extremely rare, and by 2002, the game would sell on eBay to collectors for a few hundred dollars. For many years, the game passed hands through anonymous torrent files. In 2008, a blogger discovered the game and started a YouTube channel to highlight it and to follow the rediscovery of its sequel.

Reception 
Tap Repeatedly thought the game was the strangest they had ever played, and loved the game for it. Quandary felt the title's identity was torn between a game and an exploration of multimedia capabilities. PC Multimedia & Entertainment Magazine wrote that while the game is enjoyable to play, it may be asking too much of their readers to take a leap of faith and pay for the product. Vice described it as one of the most bizarre and terrifying games of all time, additionally deeming it "self-indulgent", "psychedelic", "disturbing", and "niche". The site also pointed out that the game is often ridiculed as an example of the strangeness of Japanese culture, rather than a testament to the blood, sweat, and tears Sato poured into his work. Complex listed the game in a list of The 10 Weirdest Japanese Video Games Ever Made, deeming it an obscure freak show. Wired praised the game as an overwhelmingly surreal Myst-like experience, complimenting Sato's simultaneously elaborate and childlike art design. Hardcore Gaming 101 noted the difficulty of the puzzles due to the game purposely being devoid of logic, and embraced this as a positive. Kill Screen felt that the title was not a game, and rather a window into the recesses of Sato's mind. Biglobe felt the characters were eerie and humorous, praising the sense of oriental animism that pervaded the experience. Publication Karapaia thought the game "tastes the strangeness that lurks in the depths of psychology". Rolling Stone suggested that the game instills an "initial tinge of disorientation [that] gives way to cultural vertigo" as the Western player realises that unlike usual games where they kill the enemy, the protagonist has to die in order to progress. Wall Street Journal deemed it "more of a journey than a story or moral tale".

Next Generation reviewed the Macintosh version of the game, rating it two stars out of five, and stated that "Eastern Mind gives the feel of a complex mythology based on the Buddhist ideal of continual reincarnation as progress toward redemption. Maybe players versed in ethnic studies can even use that knowledge to their advantage in the course of the game; but we have no idea."

Chu-Teng 
A sequel, titled Chu-Teng (中天), was released in Japan for Mac and Windows in October 1995. Deemed a "lost game" and becoming an urban legend due to its rarity, there were claims of "no record of anyone having ever played" it, with some believing that it was an unfinished prototype or an unattainable relic, with even Sato claiming to not have a copy. In 2013, an ISO image of the game surfaced from an anonymous 4chan user, which was then uploaded onto the internet. Vice deemed this rediscovery an unusual case of fan dedication and love of Sato bringing a game back from the dead. Reviewing the game, Hardcore Gaming 101 felt that with the transmigration element dropped, it became more of an ordinary adventure game than its predecessor, which was a "letdown" due to stripping away what they believed made Eastern Mind "great".

References 

1994 video games
Classic Mac OS games
Sony Music Entertainment Japan franchises
Epic/Sony Records games
Video games developed in Japan
Video games scored by Osamu Sato
Windows games
Point-and-click adventure games
Single-player video games
Surrealist video games